Westroads Mall is an enclosed shopping mall in Omaha, Nebraska at the intersection of 100th and Dodge Streets (U.S. Route 6). It is the largest mall in Nebraska. The mall's anchor stores are The Container Store, Von Maur, JCPenney, Dick's Sporting Goods, and AMC Theatres.

History
Designed by real estate developer John Wiebe, Westroads Mall opened in 1967. Prudential Financial purchased the mall from Wiebe for $45 million in 1977. In 1997, General Growth Properties acquired the mall from Prudential. The mall was owned by both General Growth (51% share) and Canadian property development company Ivanhoe Cambridge (49% share); it was managed by General Growth Properties on behalf of the venture. General Growth Properties acquired the 49% that it didn't previously own on April 5, 2012.

The mall was renovated several times: in 1990, 1995, 1999 and 2003 and again in 2013-2014, which included the addition of an H&M store and Wi-Fi.

In May 1991, a food court opened; it was replaced in 2015 by Flagship Commons, a food hall concept located elsewhere in the mall and operated by Flagship Restaurant Group. In October 2016, The Container Store opened in the former food court space.

In December 2012, a Forever 21 Super Store opened on the lower level. The lower level formerly housed a family entertainment center, Tilt, with an arcade and indoor miniature golf course.

On January 20, 2018, Abercrombie & Fitch closed at the mall.

In August 2018, the Younkers store closed with the liquidation of its owner, Bon-Ton Stores.

Movie theaters

The first theater in the mall, the Fox Westroads, opened in November 1967. Originally a single screen theater, it was converted to the dual screen Fox Twin in 1976. In 1969, a second theater, Six West, opened at the mall -- reportedly the first six-screen theater complex in the United States. Both theaters were eventually purchased by AMC Theatres and marketed together as the Westroads 8. The theaters closed in 1997.

In November 2008, Rave Motion Pictures opened a new 14-screen digital multiplex. It was acquired by AMC Theatres in 2013.

Anchors
Mall anchors include:
JCPenney (177,200 sf) Opened 1968.
Von Maur (179,000 sf) Opened August 1995.
Dick's Sporting Goods (84,000 sf) [in old Galyan's Sporting Goods] Opened October 2005.
AMC Theatres (73,000 sf) [built on old Kilpatrick's-Younkers space] (was Rave Cinemas) Opened November 2008.
Forever 21 (25,000 sf) Opened December 2012.

Former anchors
Kilpatrick's (200,000 sf) Opened November 1967, converted to Younkers 1982. Shuttered October 2003.
Brandeis (80,000 sf) Opened October 1972. Converted to Younkers Juniors August 1987. Store shuttered and converted to mall space.
Montgomery Ward (177,600 sf) Opened 1968. Shuttered November 1998. Rebuilt as The Jones Store.
The Jones Store (177,600 sf) Opened October 1999. Shuttered August 2003.
Galyan's Sporting Goods (84,000 sf) Opened August 2003. Converted to Dick's Sporting Goods October 2005.
Younkers (177,600 sf) [in former Montgomery Ward/The Jones Store] Opened October 2003, closed 2018.

2007 shooting

On December 5, 2007, 19-year old Robert A. Hawkins entered the Von Maur anchor store with a rifle and opened fire. Nine people were killed, including the gunman, and four others were injured, all within Von Maur. The mall reopened on December 8, 2007 with increased security, while Von Maur reopened December 20, 2007.

March 2021 shooting
On March 12, 2021, 21-year old Kenya Jenkins was detained for shoplifting from the J.C. Penney store by staff and security. Officer Jeffrey Wittstruck from the Omaha Police Department responded and Jenkins allegedly produced a .380 Taurus firearm, shooting Officer Wittstruck four times in the face, head, and shoulder. Jenkins immediately fled the J.C. Penney loss prevention office to a vehicle and left the property. Officer Joseph Kunza arrived soon after Jenkins fled the scene and, with the help of the Westroads Mall Security staff, gave aid to Wittstruck's gunshot wounds. Jenkins was apprehended after fleeing the scene after a high-speed chase on Westbound Interstate 80 that ended outside of Lincoln, NE. The .380 Taurus sidearm was located within the vehicle Jenkins had fled in. The mall was locked down and cleared by Law Enforcement and Security for a short time while the scene was investigated. No shots were fired in the main mall area or any other store. Wittstruck survived the shooting and is expected to recover.

April 2021 shooting 
On April 17, 2021, two individuals exchanged gunfire on the first floor of the mall near the JCPenney store following a confrontation in line at a pretzel stand.  The men fought, and after 16-year old Makhi Woolridge-Jones drew a gun 21-year old Trequez Swift kicked the gun and fled, he was hit twice in the back and died of his injuries three hours later.  Swift's compnaion returned fire but did not hit anyone.  Woolridge-Jones was sentenced to a minimum of 35 years in prison after being convicted of second-degree murder.

References

Shopping malls in Omaha, Nebraska
Brookfield Properties
Cinemas and movie theaters in Omaha, Nebraska
West Omaha, Nebraska
Shopping malls established in 1967